Eghtedar Novin Ferdosi Mashhad Futsal Club (Persian: باشگاه فوتسال اقتدار نوین فردوسی مشهد) is an Iranian futsal club based in Mashhad, Iran. They currently compete in the Iranian Futsal Super League, the 1st tier of Iranian futsal.

Season-by-season 
The table below chronicles the achievements of the Club in various competitions.

First-team squad

External links 
 Official Website (Persian)

References 

Futsal clubs in Iran
Sport in Mashhad
Futsal clubs established in 2011
2011 establishments in Iran